Pinto is a surname.

Pinto may also refer to:

Biology and engineering
AJI T-610 Super Pinto, a modified version of the Temco TT Pinto
Pinto bean, a type of mottled bean
Pinto horse, a horse coat color that consists of large patches of white and another color
Ford Pinto, a subcompact car manufactured by the Ford Motor Company for the North American market
Temco TT Pinto, a jet-powered, tandem two-place primary trainer aircraft used by the United States Navy

Subculture 

 Pinto (subculture), a Chicano subculture of people who are or have been incarcerated

Places
Pinto, Chile
Pinto, Magdalena, Colombia
Cittá Pinto or Qormi, Malta
Pinto, Madrid, Spain
Pinto, Maryland, United States
Pinto, Santiago del Estero, Argentina
Pinto Battery, a former artillery battery in Birżebbuġa, Malta

Films
Pinto (film), a 1920 American comedy western film directed by Victor Schertzinger

Music
Pinto (album), a 2022 album by Canadian country artist Sykamore

See also
Gallo pinto, a dish traditional to Nicaragua and Costa Rica consisting primarily of beans and rice
Conspiracy of the Pintos, a rebellion against Portuguese rule in Goa, India in 1787
María Pinto, a town and commune in Chile
Palo Pinto County, Texas, United States
Pinto Martins International Airport, Brazil
Rodovia Carvalho Pinto, a highway in Brazil
Estádio Governador Magalhães Pinto or Estádio Mineirão, a football stadium in Brazil
Pint, a unit of measurement
Pinta (disambiguation)